Claude-René Thibaut de Noblet de La Rochethulon (1749-1821) was a French politician. He served as a member of the Chamber of Deputies from 1815 to 1819.

References

1749 births
1821 deaths
18th-century French military personnel
People from Deux-Sèvres
Members of the Chamber of Deputies of the Bourbon Restoration
Knights of the Order of Saint Louis